The boxing tournament at the 1959 Mediterranean Games was held in Beirut, Lebanon.

Medalists

Medal table

Note: Official 1959 Mediterranean Games report erroneously omits bronze medal won by José Luis Biescas in the –57 kg category

References
1959 Mediterranean Games report at the International Committee of Mediterranean Games (CIJM) website
1959 Mediterranean Games boxing tournament at Amateur Boxing Results
List of Olympians who won medals at the Mediterranean Games at Olympedia.org

Medi
Boxing
1959